Louis Victor may refer to:

 Louis Victor, Prince of Carignano, aristocrat
 Archduke Ludwig Viktor of Austria,  aristocrat
 Louis-Victor Sicotte, lawyer
 Louis-Victor Marcé, psychiatrist
 Louis Victor Robert Schwartzkopff, industrialist
 Louis Victor de Blacquetot de Caux, politician
 Louis Victor Dubois, politician